Indole-3-butyric acid (1H-indole-3-butanoic acid, IBA) is a white to light-yellow crystalline solid, with the molecular formula C12H13NO2.  It melts at 125 °C in atmospheric pressure and decomposes before boiling. IBA is a plant hormone in the auxin family and is an ingredient in many commercial horticultural plant rooting products.

Plant hormone
Since IBA is not completely soluble in water, it is typically dissolved in 75% or purer alcohol for use in plant rooting, making a solution of between 10,000 and 50,000 ppm.  This alcohol solution is then diluted with distilled water to the desired concentration. IBA is also available as a salt, which is soluble in water.  The solution should be kept in a cool, dark place for best results.

This compound had been thought to be strictly synthetic; however, it was reported that the compound was isolated from leaves and seeds of maize and other species. In maize IBA has been shown to be synthesized in vivo using IAA and other compounds as precursors. This chemical may also be extracted from any of the Salix (Willow) genus.

Plant tissue culture
In plant tissue culture IBA and other auxins are used to initiate root formation in vitro in a procedure called micropropagation. Micropropagation of plants is the process of using small samples of plants called explants and causing them to undergo growth of differentiated or undifferentiated cells. In connection with cytokinins like kinetin, auxins like IBA can be used to cause the formation of masses of undifferentiated cells called callus. Callus formation is often used as a first step process in micropropagation where the callus cells are then caused to form other tissues such as roots by exposing them to certain hormones like auxins that produce roots. The process of callus to root formation is called indirect organogenesis whereas if roots are formed from the explant directly it is called direct organogenesis.

In a study of Camellia sinensis, the effect of three different auxins, IBA, IAA and NAA were examined to determine the relative effect of each auxin on root formation. According to the result for the species, IBA was shown to produce a higher yield of roots compared to the other auxins. The effect of IBA is in concurrence with other studies where IBA is the most commonly used auxin for root formation.

Mechanism
Although the exact method of how IBA works is still largely unknown, genetic evidence has been found that suggests that IBA may be converted into IAA through a similar process to β-oxidation of fatty acids. The conversion of IBA to IAA then suggests that IBA works as a storage sink for IAA in plants. There is other evidence that suggests that IBA is not converted to IAA but acts as an auxin on its own.

References

External links

Auxins
Indoles
Carboxylic acids
Plant growth regulators